= Fighting Methodists =

Fighting Methodists was an early team name of several universities and colleges associated with the United Methodist Church. It may refer to teams now known as:

- Northwestern Wildcats
- USC Trojans
